Hot Coffee may refer to:

 Coffee, a beverage that is typically served hot
 Hot Coffee, Mississippi, a non census-designated community in Covington County, Mississippi
 Hot Coffee (minigame), a normally inaccessible minigame in the 2004 video game Grand Theft Auto: San Andreas
 Liebeck v. McDonald's Restaurants, a 1994 product liability lawsuit involving spilt hot coffee
 Hot Coffee (film), a 2011 documentary about the 1994 product liability lawsuit